I-Shift may refer to:
 Honda I-SHIFT, a transmission system offered with some Honda cars
 Volvo I-Shift, a transmission system offered with most Volvo trucks and buses
 I-mutation, a vowel shift in linguistics